This article displays the qualifying draw for the Men's doubles at the 2000 US Open.

Seeds

Qualifiers

Draw

First qualifier

Second qualifier

Third qualifier

Fourth qualifier

References
2000 US Open – Men's draws and results at the International Tennis Federation

Men's Doubles Qualifying
US Open (tennis) by year – Qualifying